The Game and Feral Animal Control Act 2002 is an act to manage and regulate the hunting of game in New South Wales in Australia.

The Act established the Game Council New South Wales.

See also
Hunting in Australia

References

External links
Game and Feral Animal Control Act 2002 at the New South Wales Government

Hunting in Australia
New South Wales legislation
2002 in Australian law
2002 in the environment
2000s in New South Wales